Sharon I. Waxman (born c.1963) is an American author, journalist, and blogger who has been a correspondent for The Washington Post and The New York Times, and founded the Hollywood and media business news site TheWrap in early 2009.

Early life and education
Waxman grew up in a Modern Orthodox, Jewish family in Cleveland, Ohio. She graduated from Barnard College in 1985 with a bachelor of arts in English literature. She then graduated from St. Antony's College, Oxford University, in 1987 with a master of philosophy in modern Middle East studies.

Career

Journalism
Waxman was a foreign correspondent in Europe and the Middle East from 1989 to 1995. During that time, she worked for Reuters, as a Jerusalem correspondent, and a number of American newspapers.

In 1995, she moved to Los Angeles to cover Hollywood for The Washington Post. In 1998, Waxman won the feature writing award for arts and entertainment from the University of Missouri. In 1999, she was nominated for the Pulitzer Prize by The Washington Post for her work covering the Second Palestinian Intifada.<ref name=Queen/ In 2000, she won the Penney Award, the highest prize in feature writing. Between 2001 and 2003, Waxman covered stories in the Middle East for The Washington Post.

In 2003, she began covering Hollywood for The New York Times.  In 2004, after being attacked repeatedly by gossip blogger Roger Friedman in his writing, she opined about Friedman: "If he spent half as much time checking his facts as he did complaining about people stealing from him, there wouldn’t be so many errors in his reporting!" She added, referring to Fox News, for whom he wrote as a freelancer: "Do they hold him to journalistic standards, or does he just get to slander people with impunity?"

In 2012, Waxman was named the best online columnist at the National Entertainment Journalism Awards. The following year, she won the Distinguished Journalist in New Media from the Society of Professional Journalists.

In 2021 Sharon Waxman was named Online Journalist of the Year by the LA Press Club's SoCal Journalism Awards, with WaxWord named as the best blog that same year. Additionally, “TheWrap-Up” podcast, creator of TheGrill   podcast has won several top awards as has the website under her editorial leadership.

Authorship
In 2005, she published the LA Times best-seller "Rebels on the Backlot: Six Maverick Directors and How They Conquered the Hollywood Studio System." The book profiles six directors, including Quentin Tarantino and David O. Russell. In 2008, Waxman published her second book, "Loot: The Battle Over the Stolen Treasures of the Ancient World," which explores the global trade in antiquities and the battle by source countries to retrieve antiquities held in Western museums.

TheWrap
Waxman founded the Hollywood and media business news site TheWrap in early 2009. According to CBS Market Watch, Waxman raised $500,000 for TheWrap news, as a news portal site covering entertainment and media, which launched on January 26, 2009. A second round of financing was closed in 2010. By 2013, TheWrap.com had grown into a site with 30 employees. It also convenes an annual conference attended by leaders in entertainment, media, and technology called TheGrill.

TheWrap has won multiple awards for investigative reporting, columns, criticism and feature writing. In 2021 Waxman was honored as the Best Online Journalist at the L.A. Press Club SoCal Journalism Awards, as well for her blog, WaxWord. TheWrap was chosen as the best online news website at the SoCal Journalism Awards in 2018, 2012 and 2009, and best entertainment website at the National Arts & Entertainment Journalism Awards in 2018. In 2019, the site won two National Arts & Entertainment Journalism Awards for the multimedia package “#AfterMeToo: 12 Accusers Share What Happened Next, From Firing to More Trauma.” In 2021, the L.A. Press Club’s SoCal Journalism Awards gave the site top prizes for feature photography as well as for its weekly podcast, “TheWrap-Up.”

She is also the creator of WrapWomen, a power base of influential women in media and entertainment, dedicated to promoting women’s leadership. WrapWomen convenes the largest annual event for women and underrepresented groups in entertainment, The Power Women Summit, which in 2021 drew 1 million streams over 3 days in a virtual format.

Toxic Workplace Allegations

In October 2021, The Daily Beast published a story about Waxman entitled "Hollywood Media Mogul Is ‘Degrading’ Boss From Hell, Her Staffers Say." 20 former employees of The Wrap spoke with The Daily Beast, detailing how Waxman's "toxic" actions in the workplace drove high turnover in her newsroom. One former staffer said that Waxman verbally berated him for slacking off when he took a few hours off one day "to bring his fiancée to the oncologist for a cancer check-up." They also  "alleged that Waxman has often had screaming outbursts at employees, engaged in demeaning behavior, and berated employees for dealing with family emergencies during work hours, including threatening one staffer for working from home to care for their injured child."

References

External links
 
 Waxman's blog: WaxWord
 TheWrap.com

Living people
Year of birth missing (living people)
Place of birth missing (living people)
American bloggers
American women journalists
Barnard College alumni
Alumni of St Antony's College, Oxford
The New York Times writers
The Washington Post journalists
Writers from Los Angeles
21st-century American women writers
21st-century American non-fiction writers
American women bloggers
Writers from Cleveland
Journalists from Ohio